Bellaphon Records is an independent German record label of Bellaphon records GmbH.  The label produces its own artists and distributes those of other labels.

Recording artists 

 Johnny Cash
 The Flippers
 Ganymed
 Geordie
 Joan Jett & the Blackhearts
 Fahrenheit 212 (de)
 Franz Lambert
 Limahl
 Merger
 Nektar
 Böhse Onkelz
 Suzi Quatro
 Ringo Starr

History 
Bellaphon were founded in 1961 by Branislav "Branco" Zivanovic (1923–1993). The company is headquartered in Frankfurt.

Labels owned 
In 1972, Bellaphon Records Riedel & Co. KG owned Bellaphon Records and Admiral Records.

Labels represented 
In 1972, Bellaphon Records Riedel & Co. KG represented Musidisc (France); Orange and Reflection (both of the United Kingdom); Audio Fidelity, Bang, Brunswick, Cadet, Cadet/Concept, Casablanca, Checker, Chess, Fantasy/Galaxy,  and Hot Wax (all of the United States); Janus and GRT (both of Canada).

Labels distributed 
In 1982, Bellaphon Import was the distributor of 65 small German rock, pop, and jazz labels throughout West Germany. The labels included Bacillus and a popular jazz and blues label, L&R.  Other notable labels distributed by Bellaphon included Concord and Enja.

Death of its founder 
Branco Zivanovic died on May 29, 1993, in Frankfurt, while serving as President of Bellaphon.  His widow, Jutta Zivanovic-Riedel, took over as head of the company. She reportedly did not have a good hand for this business and lost the distributed labels and nearly all the artists over the years. Only a few German schlager artists (e.g. Gaby Baginsky, Michael Morgan) and a few international artists (Olivia Newton-John, Graeham Goble) were left to distribute.

References

External links
bellaphon.de Official website

Record labels established in 1961
German independent record labels
IFPI members